Neckar may refer to:
 Neckar, river in Germany
 Neckar (car), produced in Heilbronn, Germany
 Neckář, Czech surname

See also
 Necker (disambiguation)